Pierre Alexis Davignon (1810 – October 7, 1878) was a physician and political figure in Canada East. He represented Rouville in the Legislative Assembly of the Province of Canada from 1848 to 1851.

Davignon studied medicine and was licensed to practise in 1832. He was named commissioner for the Tribunal for Minor Causes in 1836. Davignon married Euphémie Soupras. He did not run for reelection to the assembly in 1851. Davignon served as mayor of Longueuil from 1853 to 1861. He is believed to have died there in 1878.

His grandson Alexandre Thurber later served in the assembly.

References 
 

1810 births
1878 deaths
Mayors of places in Quebec
Members of the Legislative Assembly of the Province of Canada from Canada East
19th-century Canadian physicians
Mayors of Longueuil